In mathematics, a 4-manifold is a 4-dimensional topological manifold. A smooth 4-manifold is a 4-manifold with a smooth structure. In dimension four, in marked contrast with lower dimensions, topological and smooth manifolds  are quite different. There exist some topological 4-manifolds which admit no smooth structure, and even if there exists a smooth structure, it need not be unique (i.e. there are smooth 4-manifolds which are homeomorphic but not diffeomorphic).

4-manifolds are important in physics because in General Relativity, spacetime is modeled as a pseudo-Riemannian 4-manifold.

Topological 4-manifolds
The homotopy type of a simply connected compact 4-manifold only depends on the intersection form on the middle dimensional homology. A famous theorem of  implies that the homeomorphism type of the manifold only depends on this intersection form, and on a  invariant called the Kirby–Siebenmann invariant, and moreover that every combination of unimodular form and Kirby–Siebenmann invariant can arise, except that if the form is even, then the Kirby–Siebenmann invariant must be the signature/8 (mod 2).

Examples:
In the special case when the form is 0, this implies the 4-dimensional topological Poincaré conjecture.
If the form is the E8 lattice, this gives a manifold called the E8 manifold, a manifold not homeomorphic to any simplicial complex.
When the rank of the form is greater than about 28, the number of positive definite unimodular forms starts to increase extremely rapidly with the rank, so there are huge numbers of corresponding simply connected topological 4-manifolds (most of which seem to be of almost no interest).

If the fundamental group is too large (for example, a free group on 2 generators), then Freedman's techniques seem to fail and very little is known about such manifolds.

For any finitely presented group it is easy to construct a (smooth) compact 4-manifold with it as its fundamental group. As there is no algorithm to tell whether two finitely presented groups are isomorphic (even if one is known to be trivial) there is no algorithm to tell if two 4-manifolds have the same fundamental group. This is one reason why much of the work on 4-manifolds just considers the simply connected case: the general case of many problems is already known to be intractable.

Smooth 4-manifolds
For manifolds of dimension at most 6, any piecewise linear (PL) structure can be smoothed in an essentially unique way, so in particular the theory of 4 dimensional PL manifolds is much the same as the theory of 4 dimensional smooth manifolds.

A major open problem in the theory of smooth 4-manifolds is to classify the simply connected compact ones. 
As the topological ones are known, this breaks up into two parts:
 Which topological manifolds are smoothable?
 Classify the different smooth structures on a smoothable manifold.

There is an almost complete answer to the first problem of which simply connected compact 4-manifolds have smooth structures. 
First, the Kirby–Siebenmann class must vanish.
If the intersection form is definite Donaldson's theorem  gives a complete answer: there is a smooth structure if and only if the form is diagonalizable.
If the form is indefinite and odd there is a smooth structure.
If the form is indefinite and even we may as well assume that it is of nonpositive signature by changing orientations if necessary, in which case it is isomorphic to a sum of m copies of II1,1 and 2n copies of E8(−1) for some m and n. If m ≥ 3n (so that the dimension is at least 11/8 times the |signature|)  then there is a smooth structure, given by taking a connected sum of n K3 surfaces and m − 3n copies of S2×S2. If m ≤ 2n (so the dimension is at most 10/8 times the |signature|) then Furuta proved that no smooth structure exists . This leaves a small gap between 10/8 and 11/8 where the answer is mostly unknown. (The smallest case not covered above has n=2 and m=5, but this has also been ruled out, so the smallest lattice for which the answer is not currently known is the lattice II7,55 of rank 62 with n=3 and m=7. See  for recent (as of 2019) progress in this area.) The "11/8 conjecture" states that smooth structures do not exist if the dimension is less than 11/8 times the |signature|.

In contrast, very little is known about the second question of classifying the smooth structures on a smoothable 4-manifold; in fact, there is not a single smoothable 4-manifold where the answer is known. Donaldson showed that there are some simply connected compact 4-manifolds, such as Dolgachev surfaces, with a countably infinite number of different smooth structures. There are an uncountable number of different smooth structures on R4; see exotic R4.
Fintushel and Stern showed how to use surgery to construct large numbers of different smooth structures (indexed by arbitrary integral polynomials) on many different manifolds, using Seiberg–Witten invariants to show that the smooth structures are different. Their results suggest that any classification of simply connected smooth 4-manifolds will be very complicated. There are currently no plausible conjectures about what this classification might look like. (Some early conjectures that all simply connected smooth 4-manifolds might be connected sums of algebraic surfaces, or symplectic manifolds, possibly with orientations reversed, have been disproved.)

Special phenomena in 4 dimensions
There are several fundamental theorems about manifolds that can be proved by low-dimensional methods in dimensions at most 3, and by completely different high-dimensional methods in dimension at least 5, but which are false in dimension 4. Here are some examples:

In dimensions other than 4, the Kirby–Siebenmann invariant provides the obstruction to the existence of a PL structure; in other words a compact topological manifold has a PL structure if and only if its Kirby–Siebenmann invariant in H4(M,Z/2Z) vanishes. In dimension 3 and lower, every topological manifold admits an essentially unique PL structure. In dimension 4 there are many examples with vanishing Kirby–Siebenmann invariant but no PL structure.
In any dimension other than 4, a compact topological manifold has only a finite number of essentially distinct PL or smooth structures. In dimension 4, compact manifolds can have a countably infinite number of non-diffeomorphic smooth structures.
Four is the only dimension n for which Rn can have an exotic smooth structure. R4 has an uncountable number of exotic smooth structures; see exotic R4.
The solution to the smooth Poincaré conjecture is known in all dimensions other than 4 (it is usually false in dimensions at least 7; see exotic sphere). The Poincaré conjecture for PL manifolds has been proved for all dimensions other than 4, but it is not known whether it is true in 4 dimensions (it is equivalent to the smooth Poincaré conjecture in 4 dimensions).
The smooth h-cobordism theorem holds for cobordisms provided that neither the cobordism nor its boundary has dimension 4. It can fail if the boundary of the cobordism has dimension 4 (as shown by Donaldson). If the cobordism has dimension  4, then it is unknown whether the h-cobordism theorem holds.
A topological manifold of dimension not equal to 4 has a handlebody decomposition. Manifolds of dimension 4 have a handlebody decomposition if and only if they are smoothable.
There are compact 4-dimensional topological manifolds that are not homeomorphic to any simplicial complex. In dimension at least 5 the existence of topological manifolds not homeomorphic to a simplicial complex was an open problem. Ciprian Manolescu showed that there are manifolds in each dimension greater than or equal to 5, that are not homeomorphic to a simplicial complex.

Failure of the Whitney trick in dimension 4
According to Frank Quinn, "Two n-dimensional submanifolds of a manifold of dimension 2n will usually intersect themselves and each other in isolated points. The "Whitney trick" uses an isotopy across an embedded 2-disk to simplify these intersections. Roughly speaking this reduces the study of n-dimensional embeddings to embeddings of 2-disks. But this is not a reduction when the embedding is 4: the 2 disks themselves are middle-dimensional, so trying to embed them encounters exactly the same problems they are supposed to solve. This is the phenomenon that separates dimension 4 from others."

See also 
Kirby calculus
Algebraic surface
3-manifold
5-manifold
Enriques–Kodaira classification
Casson handle
Akbulut cork

References

External links

Geometric topology
Low-dimensional topology